Kyrgyzstan competed at the 2016 Summer Olympics in Rio de Janeiro, Brazil, from 5 to 21 August 2016. This was the nation's sixth consecutive appearance at the Olympics in the post-Soviet era.

The National Olympic Committee of the Republic of Kyrgyzstan fielded a squad of 19 athletes, 12 men and 7 women, to compete in six different sports at the Games.  Although its full roster was larger by five athletes than in London four years earlier, this was still one of Kyrgyzstan's smallest delegations sent to the Olympics. Kyrgyzstan made its Olympic return in boxing after an eight-year absence.

The Kyrgyzstan roster featured seven returning Olympians, with marathon runner Iuliia Andreeva attending her third straight Games as the oldest and most experienced participant (aged 32). Four of the returnees hailed from the wrestling team, including Asian Games bronze medalist Aisuluu Tynybekova, and veteran Janarbek Kenjeev, who qualified for his second Games after he debuted in 2004. Other notable Kyrgyz athletes included 16-year-old Denis Petrashov, who succeeded his father and three-time Olympian Yevgeny Petrashov to compete in swimming, and light heavyweight boxer Erkin Adylbek Uulu, who led his delegation as the flag bearer in the opening ceremony.

For the second Olympics in a row, Kyrgyzstan failed to win a single medal in Rio de Janeiro. On August 18, 2016, the International Olympic Committee stripped weightlifter Izzat Artykov of his bronze medal after testing positive for the stimulant strychnine. Meanwhile, several athletes on the Kyrgyzstan roster narrowly missed out of the podium, including Tynybekova, her wrestling teammate Arsen Eraliev (both placed fifth in their respective weight categories), and judoka Iurii Krakovetskii (seventh, men's +100 kg).

Athletics
 
Kyrgyz athletes have so far achieved qualifying standards in the following athletics events (up to a maximum of 3 athletes in each event):

Track & road events

Boxing

Kyrgyzstan has entered one boxer to compete in the men's light heavyweight division into the Olympic boxing tournament. Erkin Adylbek Uulu claimed his Olympic spot with a box-off victory at the 2016 Asia & Oceania Qualification Tournament in Qian'an, China.

Judo

Kyrgyzstan has qualified two judokas for each of the following weight classes at the Games. London 2012 Olympian Iurii Krakovetskii was ranked among the top 14 eligible judokas for women in the IJF World Ranking List of May 30, 2016, while Otar Bestaev at men's extra-lightweight (60 kg) earned a continental quota spot from the Asian region, as Kyrgyzstan's top-ranked judoka outside of direct qualifying position.

Swimming

Kyrgyzstan has received a Universality invitation from FINA to send two swimmers (one male and one female) to the Olympics.

Weightlifting

Kyrgyzstan has qualified one male weightlifter for the Rio Olympics by virtue of a top seven national finish at the 2016 Asian Championships. 
Meanwhile, an unused women's Olympic spot was added to the Kyrgyz weightlifting team by IWF, as a response to the vacancy of women's quota places in the individual World Rankings and to the "multiple positive cases" of doping on several nations. The team must allocate places to individual athletes by June 20, 2016.

Wrestling

Kyrgyzstan has qualified a total of six wrestlers for each of the following weight classes into the Olympic tournament. Two of them finished among the top six to book Olympic spots each in men's freestyle 97 kg and men's Greco-Roman 59 kg at the 2015 World Championships, while four further berths were awarded to Kyrgyz wrestlers, who progressed to the top two finals at the 2016 Asian Qualification Tournament.

One further wrestler claimed the remaining Olympic slot in men's Greco-Roman 66 kg to round out the Kyrgyz roster at the final meet of the World Qualification Tournament in Istanbul.

On May 11, 2016, United World Wrestling decided to replace an Olympic license from Kyrgyzstan in men's Greco-Roman 85 kg with the men's freestyle 125 kg, as a response to the doping violations at the Asian Qualification Tournament, but it was redistributed two months later, following the recent meldonium guidelines released by IOC and WADA.

Men's freestyle

Men's Greco-Roman

Women's freestyle

References

External links 

 

Olympics
2016
Nations at the 2016 Summer Olympics